"This I Swear" is a song by British singer Kim Wilde, released in January 1996 as the second single from her ninth album, Now & Forever (1995). The song was issued in a slightly different form to that which is found on the album. 12" and CD single formats also include a 'Wilde Remix'. Another track from the same album, "Heaven" was used as the B-side and underwent several remixes. The UK 12" single also contained a remix of the previous single, "Breakin' Away".

Critical reception
British magazine Music Week gave the song three out of five, describing it as "a light, fluid ballad". James Hamilton from the RM Dance Update deemed it a "sincerely cooed mushy beat-ballad".

Versions
 "This I Swear"
"This I Swear" (radio mix)
"This I Swear" (Wilde remix)

 "Heaven"
"Heaven" (Original 12")
"Heaven" (Matt Darey 12")
"Heaven" (Matt Darey dub)
"Heaven" (Matt Darey 7") 
"Heaven" (Eddy Fingers Vocal) 
"Heaven" (Eddy Fingers dub)

Charts

References

Kim Wilde songs
1996 songs
Songs written by Tony Swain (musician)
Songs written by Pam Sheyne
MCA Records singles